The Bank One Senior Championship was a golf tournament on the Champions Tour in 1999 and 2000. It was played in Dallas, Texas at the Bent Tree Country Club.

The purse for the 2000 tournament was US$1,400,000, with $210,000 going to the winner.

Winners
Bank One Senior Championship
2000 Larry Nelson

Bank One Championship
1999 Tom Watson

Source:

References

Former PGA Tour Champions events
Golf in Texas
Sports in Dallas
JPMorgan Chase